The 2014 Nigeria Entertainment Awards took place on 31 August 2014, at the Skirball Center for the Performing Arts in New York City. The eligibility period was from March 2013 to March 2014. In April 2014, the NEA reviewing committee began collecting submissions for the 2014 edition. The deadline for submission was April 30, 2014, and the nominations were announced on May 29, 2014. Tiwa Savage and Davido received the most nominations with 5 each. Don Jazzy, Flavour N'abania and Wizkid all got four nominations each, while Olamide, Patoranking, Chidinma and Oritse Femi followed closely with three nominations.

Pop duo Skuki rejected their Best New Act nomination. The group released their debut album B.A.N.G.E.R in May 2010 and won the Next Rated award at The Headies 2010.

The ceremony featured performances from artist such as El Phlex, Harrysong, Skales, Orezi, Shatta Wale, Wande Coal, J. Martins, Praiz, WizzyPro, RunTown and Patoranking. Davido won a total of 3 awards, including the Male Artist of the Year award. Tiwa Savage took home two awards for Female Artiste of the Year and Best Pop/RnB Artiste of the Year. Patoranking won the Best New Act of the Year award, while Ayo Jay emerged as the Most Promising Act to Watch. In the acting category, Tope Tedela and Funke Akindele emerged Best Actor in a Lead Role and Best Actress in a Lead Role respectively. The Best Gospel Act award went to Frank Edwards. Ghanaian reggae musician. Shatta Wale toppled Sarkodie, Mafikizolo, Mi Casa, Fally Ipupa, Uhuru and R2Bees for the African Artist of the Year award.

Performers
El Phlex
Runtown
Harrysong
Skales - "Shake Body"
Patoranking - "Alubarika", "Girlie O"
Wizzy Pro (featuring Runtown, Skales, Patoranking) - "Emergency"
Praiz - "Mercy"
Orezi - "You Garrit"
Shatta Wale
Oritse Femi - "Double Wahala"
J. Martins - "Touching Body"
Wande Coal - "Baby Hello"

Awards

Musical categories
 Best Album of the Year
Baddest Guy Ever Liveth – OlamideOnce Upon a Time – Tiwa Savage
Takeover – Kcee
L.I.F.E - Leaving an Impact for Eternity – Burna Boy
Jagz Nation, Vol.1. Thy Nation Come - Jesse Jagz
Journey – Sean Tizzle
Blessed – Flavour N'abania

Hottest Single of the Year"Pull Over" – Kcee featuring Wizkid"Aye" – Davido"Double Wahala" – Oritse Femi
"Caro" – Starboy featuring L.A.X and Wizkid
"Surulere" – Dr SID featuring Don Jazzy
"Eminado" – Tiwa Savage featuring Don Jazzy
"Touching Body" – J Martins featuring DJ Arafat

Best New Act of the YearPatorankingOrezi
Runtown
Charass
Tekno Miles
Oritse Femi
Skuki

Gospel Artist of the YearFrank Edwards Tim Godfrey and Xtreme Crew
 Flo
 Segun Oluwayomi
 Nikki Laoye
 Sabina
 Proverbs

Indigenous Artist of the YearOritse FemiReminisce
Sean Tizzle
Jaywon
Flavour N'abania
Timaya
MC Galaxy

Best Pop/R&B Artist of the YearTiwa SavagePraiz
Wande Coal
Ayoola
Banky W
Chidinma
Harry Song

Female Artist of the YearTiwa SavageYemi Alade
Seyi Shay
Cynthia Morgan
Eva Alordiah
Chidinma
Niyola

Male Artist of the YearDavidoKcee
Iyanya
Wande Coal
Wizkid
Oritse Femi
Patoranking

Best Rap Act of the YearIce PrinceOlamide
Phyno
Eva Alordiah
Show Dem Camp
Reminisce
Cynthia Morgan

Music Producer of the YearDel BDuncan Daniels
DTunes
Don Jazzy
Blaq Jerzy
Pheelz
Maleek Berry

Best Music Video of the Year (Artist & Director)"Rands and Naira" – Emmy Gee and Nick"Jaiye Jaiye" – Wizkid and Sesan
"Personally" – P-Square and Jude Okoye
"Sitting on the Throne" – Olamide and Kemi Adetiba
"Skelewu" – Davido and Moe Musa
"Eminado" – Tiwa Savage and Clarence Peters
"Oh Baby!" – Chidinma featuring Flavour and Clarence Peters

Best Collaboration"Gallardo" – Runtown featuring Davido"Mofe Lowo Ju Daddy Mi" – Reminisce featuring Davido
"Oluchi" – Solid Star featuring Flavour N'abania
"WanDaMo" – Burna Boy featuring D'banj
"Oh Baby!" – Chidinma featuring Flavour N'abania
"Emergency" – Wizzy Pro featuring Runtown, Skales and Patoranking
"Allubarika" – Patoranking featuring Timaya

Most Promising Act to WatchAyo JayDi'Ja
Elphlex
Koko J
Sna-Z
Brain
DJ Mo

Diaspora Artist of the YearL.A.XStlyzz
Wale
Bils
Lola Rae
Mr. 2Kay
Emmy Gee

African Artist of the Year (Non-Nigerian)Shatta WaleSarkodie
Mafikizolo
Mi Casa
Fally Ipupa
Uhuru
R2Bees

Film categories
Best Actor in a Lead RoleTope Tedela (A Mile from Home)Joseph Benjamin (actor) (Murder at Prime Suites)
Nkem Owoh (Maja)
Chiwetel Ejiofor (Half of a Yellow Sun)
Kanayo O. Kanayo (Apaye)

Best Supporting ActorYomi Fash-Lanso (Omo Elemosho)OC Ukeje (Half of a Yellow Sun)
Rabilu Musa Danlasan aka Ibro (Maja)
Desmond Elliott (Finding Mercy)
Shawn Faqua (Lagos Cougars)

Best Actress in a Lead RoleFunke Akindele (Agnetta O’Mpa)Nse Ikpe Etim (Journey to Self)
Damilola Adegbite (Flower Girl)
Chioma Chukwuka (Accident)
Daniella Okeke (Lagos Cougars)

Best Supporting ActressGenevieve Nnaji (Half of a Yellow Sun)Rita Dominic (Finding Mercy)
Patience Ozokwor (After the Proposal)
Tamara Eteimo (Desperate Housegirls)
Bikiya Graham-Douglas (Flower Girl)

Best DirectorDesmond Elliott (Finding Mercy)Tope Oshin-Ogun (Journey to Self)
Sadiq Mafia (Maja)
Teco Benson (Accident)
Biyi Bandele (Half of a Yellow Sun)

Best PictureHalf of a Yellow Sun
Journey to Self
Maja
Accident
Murder at Prime Suites

Other categories

Entertainment Personality of the Year
Denrele
Toolz
Liz Yemoja
Adams
Toke Makinwa
Lami
IK Ogbonna

Entertainment Executive of the Year
E-Money – Five Star Records
Efe Omorogbe – Hypertek
Don Jazzy – Mavin Records
Illbliss – Capital Records
Ayo Animashaun – HipTV
Steve Babaeko – X3m Music
Okwudili-umenyior – Erik Manny Records

Best OAP
Yaw – Wazobia FM
Matilda – Rhythm FM Abuja
Dotun Kayode – Cool FM
D Don – Rainbow FM
Toke Makinwa – Rhythm 93.7 FM
Maria Okanrende – The Beat 99.9 FM
Jluv – City 105.1

Funniest Comedian of Year
Bovi
Bash
Funny Bone
Ajebo
Akpororo
Helen Paul
Chi Gurl

World DJ
DJ Tunez – New York
DJ IK – Nigeria
DJ Shinski – Houston
DJ Cuppy – UK
DJ Flexx – Nigeria
DJ Spinall – Nigeria
DJ Xclusive – Nigeria

References

2014 film awards
2014 music awards
Ent 
Ent
2014